In enzymology, a mevaldate reductase is an enzyme that catalyzes the chemical reaction

(R)-mevalonate + NAD+  mevaldate + NADH + H+

Thus, the two substrates of this enzyme are (R)-mevalonate and NAD+, whereas its 3 products are mevaldate, NADH, and H+.

This enzyme belongs to the family of oxidoreductases, specifically those acting on the CH-OH group of donor with NAD+ or NADP+ as acceptor. The systematic name of this enzyme class is (R)-mevalonate:NAD+ oxidoreductase. This enzyme is also called mevalonic dehydrogenase.

References

External links

EC 1.1.1
NADH-dependent enzymes
Enzymes of unknown structure